is the theme song of the 1991 Japanese anime Dragon Quest: The Adventure of Dai. It was composed by Koichi Sugiyama, with lyrics by Kohei Oikawa, and sung by Jiro Dan. The song was published by Nippon Columbia on November 1, 1991 as a single.

Track list

References 

1991 singles
Anime songs
Dragon Quest music
Nippon Columbia artists